The Football Conference Youth Alliance  (known sometimes as the Conference Youth Alliance) was formed in 2005 as the official U19s Youth League for professional teams, semi-professional and for non-league teams who compete in the Football Conference league and respective non-league competitions in England. Teams who compete in the Football Conference Youth Alliance combine football training with education, offering 16-18 year olds the chance to play elite youth football at U19s level and gain academic qualifications at BTEC National or Diploma level, operating on a similar model to that of the Football League Youth Alliance and FA Premier Academy League.

The league comprises seven divisions (North, Central, Southern Premier and Southern A, B, and C). The title winners of each of the seven Football Conference Youth Alliance divisions go into a Championship Play Off to find the National Football Conference Youth Alliance Champion each season.

Current structure
See Youth Alliance Page for 2011–12 season league tables.

The competition is currently (as of 2011–12) contested by 70 clubs, split into six regional conferences: North (10 teams), Central (12 teams), South Premier (12 teams), South A (12 teams), South B (12 teams) and South C (12 teams).

North Division

 Birmingham City Blues
 Boston United
 Fleetwood Town
 Gateshead
 Halifax Town
 Ilkeston
 MMU/Newcastle
 Newcastle Town
 Stalybridge Celtic

Central Division

 Birmingham City Whites
 Chasetown
 Corby Town
 FootballCV Reds
 Hitchin Town
 Kettering Town
 Kidderminster Harriers
 Luton Town
 Oxford City
 St Albans City
 Tamworth
 Watford Trust & Hertswood School

South Premier Division

 AFC Sudbury
 AFC Wimbledon
 Basingstoke Town
 Bromley Blues
 Dartford Whites
 Dover Athletic
 Ebbsfleet United
 Havant & Waterlooville
 Histon
 Oxford United
 Woking
 Weston-super-Mare

South A Division

 Boreham Wood Whites
 Carshalton Athletic
 Eastleigh
 Hampton & Richmond Borough
 JMA Reading
 Kingstonian
 Leatherhead
 St Albans Saints
 Tooting & Mitcham United
 Watford FC Community Sports & Education Trust
 Wealdstone
 Wingate & Finchley

South B Division

 Boreham Wood Blues
 Bishops Stortford
 Chelmsford City
 Dagenham & Redbridge
 Halstead Town
 Redbridge
 Romford
 Tilbury
 Thurrock
 Tottenham Hotspur
 Waltham Abbey
 Winchmore Hill

South C Division

 Bromley Whites
 Cambridge United
 Charlton Athletic Trust
 Cray Wanderers
 Croydon Athletic
 Dartford Reds
 Deal Town
 Dulwich Hamlet
 Maidstone United
 Sittingbourne
 Tonbridge Angels
 Welling United

See also
Premier Academy League
FA Youth Cup
The Central League
The Football Combination
The Football League

References

External links
Official page on the Football Conference website

+
Sports leagues established in 2005